JST connectors are electrical connectors manufactured to the design standards originally developed by J.S.T. Mfg. Co. (Japan Solderless Terminal).  JST manufactures numerous series (families) and pitches (pin-to-pin distance) of connectors.

JST connectors are used in many types of products, and commonly used by electronics hobbyists and consumer products for rechargeable battery packs, battery balancers, battery eliminator circuits, 3D printers, and radio controlled servos.

The term "JST" is sometimes incorrectly used as a vernacular term meaning any small white electrical connector mounted on PCBs.

Connector series
JST manufactures a large number of series (families) of connectors.  The PCB (wire-to-board) connectors are available in top (vertical) or side (horizontal) entry, and through-hole or surface-mount.

Connector soldering
A majority of JST through-hole headers can't withstand the temperatures required for reflow soldering, because the plastic has a lower melting point since they were designed for wave soldering methods.  Some JST surface-mount headers are designed to handle higher temperatures of reflow soldering.

Connector confusion on the internet
End-users and 3rd-party sellers on eBay often describe connectors by their wrong name thus perpetuating confusion of the exact series of a specific connector.  It is very common in blogs and websites to incorrectly name a specific connector only by the name of the manufacturer.

To minimize confusion, it is best to describe a connector using: the manufacturer's name, exact connector series, and optionally the pitch, such as "JST-XH" or "JST-XH-2.50mm" or "2.50mm JST XH-series" or other variations.

The official J.S.T. Co. website has a tool which allows users to check certain models for their authenticity and specifications.

Gallery

See also

 DC connector
 Electrical connector
 Pin header connector

References

External links

 , top-level websites for 12 countries, such as America and UK.
 List of all connector series, sorted by alphabetical
 Wire-to-Board crimp connector series, sorted by pitch
 Wire-to-Board IDC connector series, sorted by pitch

Companies based in Osaka Prefecture
 
Electrical signal connectors